A boat show is a public exhibition or trade fair of current boat models, debuts, concept vessels, or out-of-production classics. Due to the nature of the industry building around yachting and nautical tourism, a boat show may be a social event. It is commonly attended by marine manufacturers, ship and boat builders as well as yachtsmen.

Most boat shows occur once a year, typically for the duration of a week. They may have exhibitions on land or on water. Boat shows are vital to marine manufacturers and local dealers as a public relations exercise, for advertising products, and for increasing publicity.

List of boat shows 
The following boat shows are recognized by the International Federation of Boat Show Organisers (IFBSO).

Non-recognized but large boat shows include:

References

External links 
 International Federation of Boat Show Organisers (IFBSO)